General Tsao may refer to:

Historical generals with the name spelled Ts'ao in Wade–Giles romanisation (Cáo in Pinyin, 曹 in Chinese characters), often simplified to Tsao in non-specialist works:
Generals under Ts'ao Ts'ao (Cao Cao) in the late Han Dynasty:
Ts'ao Ch'un (d. 210), cavalry general
Ts'ao Chen (d. 231)
Ts'ao Jen (168–223)
Ts'ao Ch'in (d. 1461), Ming Dynasty general who staged the Rebellion of Ts'ao Ch'in (Cao Qin)
Ts'ao Hsing (fl. 196), late Han Dynasty general under Lü Pu (Lü Bu)
Ts'ao Kun (1862–1938), general in the Beiyang Army under Yuan Shikai in the Republic of China's Warlord era

Fictional characters:
General Tsao (Sly Cooper), character in Sly Cooper video game series
General Tsao, character in 1986 Hong Kong film Peking Opera Blues

See also
General Tso (disambiguation)
Tsao (disambiguation)